Story in Taipei (also translated as Story of Taipei) is a 2017 Taiwanese film written and directed by Huang Ying-hsiung (黃英雄). It has been described as Taiwan's first cult film, of the "so bad it's good" type.

Plot 
The somewhat convoluted plot involves a thief who steals a taxi, which is then boarded by a passenger. They are involved in an accident with a drunk-driving politician, who is having an affair with his assistant. Fearing scandal, he offers to buy the taxi and pay NT$500,000 in exchange for silence. The taxi-driving thief and his passenger try to blackmail the politician for more money. Unknown to them all, there is a person in the taxi's boot. The politician's wife, a doctor, starts investigating her husband's activities. At the end, all characters meet and a lot of issues are revealed, including that some other subplots were just made up stories.

Cast 
Su Yinan (蘇尹男) as lawmaker Ke Xien
Chen Yi-an (陳怡安) as Sun Ying, his wife
 (李宓) as Guo Xinchun, his assistant
 (邱志宇) as Tony, Sun Ying's colleague
 (張哲豪) as Lin Xiaoqing, the thief
Fu Peiling (傅佩玲) as Lin Qiuhong, the passenger who blackmails Ke Xien
Fang Shengqiu (方升暘) as Ke's assistant
Kang Luqi (康祿祺) as a builder

Reception 
After opening in just three theaters in 2017, the film quickly became a social media phenomenon because of its flaws. It achieved more than NT$5 million in box office receipts and played for 38 days. It has been described as the lowest quality film in Taiwanese history and compared to The Room.

References

External links 

2017 films
Taiwanese crime films
Films set in Taiwan
Films set in Taipei